Sokół (Polish: Falcon) was a brand of motorcycles manufactured in Poland before World War II for both civilian and military use. Initially designed and produced by the Centralne Warsztaty Samochodowe CWS company (Central Automotive Workshops), they were continued after its takeover by the PZInż between 1934 and 1939.

History

The name was first used for the Sokół 600 RT tourist motorcycle, but is the most associated with the Polish Sokół 1000, a heavy motorcycle produced after 1936 for the Polish Army.

Chronologically, the Sokół motorcycles were as follows:
 Sokół 1000 M111 (CWS M111)
 Sokół 600 RT M211
 Sokół 500, a sport motorcycle
 Sokół 200 M411
 Sokół 125, built 1947–1950, a different design based on German DKW RT 125.

Bibliography

 Zbigniew Otoczyński "Sokół 600 i 1000", WKŁ - Wydawnictwa Komunikacji i Łączności Sp. z o.o 1999, 
Jan Tarczyński "Polskie motocykle 1918-1945" "The Polish motorcycle industry 1918-1945"  Wydawnictwa Komunikacji i Łączności WKŁ 2005, 
A.Jońca, R.Szubański, J.Tarczyński: "Wrzesień 39 - Pojazdy Wojska Polskiego", WKŁ, Warszawa 1990
A.Jońca, J.Tarczyński, K.Barbarski: "Pojazdy w Wojsku Polskim - Polish Army Vehicles - 1918-1939", AJaKS, Pruszków 1995

 
Motorcycle manufacturers of Poland
Science and technology in Poland
Polish brands